Colchester United Ladies Football Club was an English ladies football team based in Colchester, Essex, and affiliated to Colchester United FC. In 2013, the club folded.

History
The club was founded in 1992 under the name of Colchester Royals. In 1998, it became affiliated to Colchester United FC.

The club won the 2006–07 South East Combination Women's Football League winning promotion to the FA Women's Premier League Southern Division, the second tier of English women's football.

The club folded in 2013 and no longer competes in any football league. Colchester United Football in the Community released plans to reform the Women's team in time for the 2023/24 season.

League honours
Ladies' teams

South East Combination Women's Football League
Champions: 2006–07

Eastern Region Premier Division
Champions: 2001–02, 2004–05

Eastern Region League Division One
Runners-up: 1996–97

Eastern Region League Division Two
Champions: 1993–94

Essex County Women's League Division Two
Champions: 2002–03

Girls' teams

Essex County Girls League

Under 14s A
Champions: 2000–01

Under 13s
Champions: 2002–03

Under 12s
Champions: 2003–04

Under 12s A
Champions: 2000–01

Under 11s
Champions: 2000–01

Cup honours
Ladies' teams

Eastern Region League Cup
Runners-up: 1998–99, 2004–05

Eastern Region Women's League Plate
Champions: 1994/95

Essex County FA Women's Cup
Runners-up: 1998–99, 2001–02, 2002–03

Lisa Slater Memorial Shield Winners
Champions: 1995–96

Girls' teams

Essex County Girls League Cup

Under 12s
Champions: 2003–04

Under 11s
Champions: 1999/00

External links
Colchester United F.C. official web site
Broad Lane Sports Ground

Sport in Colchester
Colchester United F.C.
Defunct women's football clubs in England
Defunct football clubs in Essex
Association football clubs established in 1992
1992 establishments in England
FA Women's National League teams
Association football clubs disestablished in 2013
2013 disestablishments in England